Christopher Baryla (born October 24, 1982) is a Canadian professional golfer who has played on the Web.com Tour and the PGA Tour.

Baryla was born in Calgary. He graduated from the University of Texas at El Paso, and turned pro in 2004.

Baryla won his first Nationwide Tour event and first professional event at the 2009 Chattanooga Classic, winning in dramatic fashion. He led by two strokes going into the final round, and started bogey, bogey. But he rallied, making seven birdies after the poor start, and ended up with a one stroke victory over Troy Kelly. He finished 19th on the money list to earn his 2010 PGA Tour card. Before this win, his best finish on the Nationwide Tour was a runner-up finish, in the 2007 Henrico County Open. Baryla's 2010 season ended after just seven events (two cuts) due to hip problems and surgery on a torn labrum. He was to begin 2011 on a medical exemption which will give him fifteen events to keep his PGA Tour card by earning the equivalent of Troy Merritt's winnings, the golfer who finished 125th on the Tour's money list in 2010. His status increased after he finished inside the Top 25 during the Tour's Qualifying School and secured a Tour Card, where he only made one cut in 20 attempts.

Professional wins (1)

Nationwide Tour wins (1)

Nationwide Tour playoff record (0–1)

Results in major championships

CUT = missed the halfway cut
Note: Baryla only played in the U.S. Open.

See also
2009 Nationwide Tour graduates
2010 PGA Tour Qualifying School graduates

External links

Canadian male golfers
UTEP Miners men's golfers
PGA Tour golfers
Golfing people from Alberta
Korn Ferry Tour graduates
Sportspeople from Calgary
1982 births
Living people